Lee Sang-ho (hangul: 이상호, hanja: 李尙浩; born 18 November 1981) is a South Korean footballer who plays for PTT Rayong in the Thai Division 1 League. (formerly Bucheon SK, Jeju United)

Biography 
Lee Sang-ho was born in 1981 in South Korea.

Career 

In January 2019, Lee Sang Hoo to persib bandung Liga Gojek side Fc Seoul.

External links 
 
 

1981 births
Living people
South Korean footballers
South Korean expatriate footballers
Dankook University alumni
Jeju United FC players
Jeonnam Dragons players
K League 1 players
Expatriate footballers in Thailand
Association football defenders
South Korea international footballers